Meher may refer to:

People
 Danthala Venkata Meher Baba (1950–2008), an Indian cricketer
 Gangadhar Meher (1862–1924), an Indian poet
 Gurubari Meher, a martyr in the Indian independence movement against Britain
 Harshad Meher (born 1992), an Indian footballer
 Jayanta Meher (born 1986), an Indian painter
 Jog Meher Shrestha, a Nepalese politician
 Meher Ali Shah (1859–1937), a Muslim scholar of the Chishti Order of Sufism
 Meher Baba (1894–1969), an Indian spiritual leader
 Meher Bukhari (born in 1984), a journalist and a television host from Pakistan
 Mehar Mittal (born 1935), an Indian comedian
 Meher Ramesh, an Indian film director
 Kailash Chandra Meher (born 1954), an Indian painter
 Kersi Meher-Homji, an Australian journalist
 Sadhu Meher, an Indian actor, director, and producer

Media
 Meher (TV series), a television series in India

Places
 Méhers, a commune in France
 Meher Mount, a spiritual retreat center in Ojai, California dedicated to Meher Baba
 Meher Pilgrim Center, a spiritual retreat in India dedicated to Meher Baba
 Meher Spiritual Center, a spiritual center in the U.S. dedicated to Meher Baba

Other uses
 Gangadhar Meher College (Autonomous), Sambalpur, a college in India
 Mahr, also spelled meher, a payment given by the husband to the wife in Muslim marriages
 Meherzad, a Zoroastrian name which is related to the Yazata Mithra.

See also
 Mehr (disambiguation)